Mooreland is a property in Brentwood, Tennessee that was built c.1838 and that was listed on the National Register of Historic Places in 1975.

It was built by Robert Irvin Moore and includes Greek Revival architecture.

It is one of about thirty "significant brick and frame residences" surviving in Williamson County that "were the center of large plantations " and display "some of the finest construction of the ante-bellum era."  It faces on the Franklin and Columbia Pike that ran south from Brentwood to Franklin to Columbia.

See also
Mountview, also on the pike north of Franklin and NRHP-listed
James Johnston House, also on the pike north of Franklin and NRHP-listed
Aspen Grove, also on the pike north of Franklin and a Williamson County historic resource
Thomas Shute House, also on the pike north of Franklin and a Williamson County historic resource
Alpheus Truett House, also on the pike north of Franklin and a Williamson County historic resource

References

Houses in Williamson County, Tennessee
Greek Revival houses in Tennessee
Residential buildings completed in 1838
National Register of Historic Places in Williamson County, Tennessee